Kusug Tausug is a political organization which has party-list representation in the House of Representatives of the Philippines. It seeks to represent the Tausūg indigenous people and other marginalized sectors.

History

17th Congress
Kusug Tausug took part in the 2016 Philippine elections, where they secured a lone seat in the House of Representatives. The seat was filled in by Shernee Abubakar Tan, daughter of Sulu governor Abdusakur Mahail Tan

Shernee Tan proposed the martial law in Mindanao, imposed in response to the Marawi siege of 2017, to be expanded nationwide.

Kusug Tausug was among the political organizations in the House of Representatives that joined the Coalition for Change of PDP-Laban, the new ruling party.

18th Congress
They participated in the 2019 Philippine elections, where they retained their lone seat in the House of Representatives. Shernee Tan also remained as Kusug Tausug's representative in the Congress.

Tan as Kusug Tausug representative was critical of the interim Bangsamoro Transition Authority (BTA) government in Bangsamoro. She opposed the BTA's request to extend the interim period and postpone the scheduled 2022 Bangsamoro elections as per the Bangsamoro Organic Law, saying the move was meant to cover up the BTA's inadequate performance. Although Tan has been amenable to the election postponement if a referendum was held for the measure.

Kusug Tausug through Tan also proposed mandating government and private establishments to allot at least two places of worship in response to the lack of space for adherents of Islam and other non-Catholic faiths.

External links

References

Party-lists represented in the House of Representatives of the Philippines
Local political parties in the Philippines